Seventeen is an American bimonthly teen magazine based in New York City. The magazine's reader-base is 13-to-19-year-old females. It is published by New York City-based Hearst Magazines and debuted in New York City in August 1944. It began as a publication geared toward inspiring teen girls to become model workers and citizens. Soon after its debut, Seventeen took a more fashion- and romance-oriented approach in presenting its material, while promoting self-confidence in young women. It was first published based in New York City on September 1944 by Walter Annenberg's Triangle Publications and The Atlantic Monthly Company in 1944 to 1946.

Seventeen history
The first publisher in New York City of Seventeen, Helen Valentine, provided teenaged girls with working-woman role models and information about their personality development and overall growth. Seventeen enhanced the role of teenagers as consumers of popular culture. The concept of "teenager" as a distinct demographic originated in that era. In July 1944, King Features Syndicate began running the comic strip Teena, created by cartoonist Hilda Terry, in which a typical teenager's life was examined. Teena ran internationally in newspapers for 20 years.

After Seventeen was launched in New York City in September 1944, Estelle Ellis Rubenstein, the magazine's promotion director, introduced advertisers to the life of teenaged girls through Teena, selling advertising in Seventeen at the same time. From 1945 to 1946, the magazine surveyed teen girls to better understand the magazine's audience. The magazine became an important source of information to manufacturers seeking guidance on how to satisfy consumer demand among teenagers. Today, the magazine entertains and promotes self-confidence in young women.

Sylvia Plath submitted nearly 50 pieces to Seventeen before her first short story, "And Summer Will Not Come Again", was accepted and published in the August 1950 issue.

Joyce Walker became the first black model to be featured on the cover of Seventeen in July 1971. In 1981, Whitney Houston was also featured on the cover of the magazine.

New York City-based News Corporation bought Triangle in 1988 and sold Seventeen to K-III Communications (later Primedia) in 1991. In 1999 Linda Platzner was named Publisher and then President of the Seventeen magazine group. Primedia sold the magazine to New York City-based Hearst in a process led by Platzner in 2003. Seventeen remains popular on newsstands today despite greater competition.

In 2010, writer Jamie Keiles conducted "The Seventeen Magazine Project", an experiment in which she followed the advice of Seventeen magazine for 30 days. In 2012, in response to reader protests against the magazine's airbrushing its models' photos, Seventeen ended its practice of using digital photo manipulation to enhance published photographs. (See more below under Controversy).

In August 2016, Michelle Tan was fired from her position as editor in chief while she was on maternity leave. It was announced shortly thereafter that Michele Promaulayko, who was appointed editor in chief of Cosmopolitan, would also serve as Seventeen editorial director. Starting with their Dec/Jan 2017 issue, the magazine was to start publishing only six issues a year instead of 10, to focus on their online presence to appeal to the Generation Z market. In October 2018, it was announced that Jessica Pels would take over from Promaulayko as editor in chief of Cosmopolitan, and that Kristin Koch was appointed Seventeen's new executive director, overseeing all its content. In November 2018, it was announced that Seventeen's print editions would be reduced to special stand-alone issues.

International editions
 The South African edition of Seventeen magazine is published by 8 Ink Media based in Cape Town. The editor is Janine Jellars. The magazine ceased publication in 2013.
 The Philippine version is published by Summit Media, but it ceased publication in April 2009.
 The Mexican edition is published by Editorial Televisa, but it ceased publication due to the COVID-19 pandemic in June 2020.
 The Indian edition is published by Apricot Publications Pvt. Ltd in Mumbai.
 The Malaysian version of Seventeen is published by Bluinc.
 Seventeen Singapore is published by SPH Magazines.
 The Thai edition of Seventeen is published by Media Transasia Limited in Bangkok.
 In the United Kingdom there is no Seventeen magazine, but there was a similar magazine touted as a fresher and edgier competition to Teen Vogue called Company which folded in 2014.
 The Japanese version of Seventeen is published by Shueisha Publishing Co., Ltd.
 The Indonesian edition of Seventeen is published by Femina Group, it ceased publication in September 2009.

Seventeen in other media
Seventeen has also published books for teens, addressing such topics as beauty, style, college, and health and fitness.

America's Next Top Model
Seventeen was a sponsor of America's Next Top Model. The winners of America's Next Top Model from seasons seven through 14 have each appeared on a cover of Seventeen magazine, including CariDee English, Jaslene Gonzalez, Sal Stowers, Whitney Thompson, McKey Sullivan, Teyona Anderson, Nicole Fox, and Krista White. Originally, the magazine only planned on sponsoring the show from cycles seven through 10; however, with such a high success rate and a great opportunity the magazine provided for these women, it sponsored the cycles until the show decided to move the winners to Vogue Italia.

Cyberbu//y
In 2011, Seventeen worked with ABC Family to make a film about a girl who gets bullied online called Cyberbu//y. The point was to raise awareness of cyber bullying and to "delete digital drama". The film premiered July 17, 2011, on ABC Family.

Petition on image manipulation
In April 2012, 14-year-old Julia Bluhm from Waterville, Maine, created a petition on Change.org titled "Seventeen Magazine: Give Girls Images of Real Girls!' advocating for the magazine publication to vow to print at least one unaltered and Photoshop-FREE monthly photo spread". As a self-proclaimed "SPARK Summit Activist", Bluhm petitioned for an end to digital photo manipulation.

In May 2012 Bluhm, her mother, and a group of fellow "SPARK Summit" members were invited to the New York headquarters of Seventeen by editor-in-chief Ann Shoket.

On 3 July 2012, Bluhm announced that her petition had "won" after receiving almost 85,000 signatures online, resulting in Seventeen editorial staff pledging to always feature one photo spread per month without the use of digital photo manipulation. Furthermore, Seventeen editor-in-chief Shoket published an editorial praising The Body Peace Treaty in the August 2012 Seventeen issue, offering the push against digital photo manipulation as an extension of the magazine's ongoing Body Peace Project.

Project Runway: Threads and Project Runway: Junior
Seventeen was a sponsor of Project Runway: Threads, now a sponsor of Project Runway: Junior. The winners of Project Runway: Junior from seasons one and two have had their designs feature in a fashion spread of Seventeen, including Maya and Chelsea.

Editors
Helen Valentine (1944–1953)
 Enid A. Haupt (1953–1970)
 Midge Richardson (1975–1993)
 Maci Hunter (1993–1994)
 Caroline Miller (1994–1997)
 Meredith Berlin (1997–1999)
 Patrice G. Adcroft
 Mia Fausto-Cruz
 Simon Dumenco
 Sabrina Weill
 Annemarie Iverson (2000–2001)
 Atoosa Rubenstein (2003–2007)
 Ann Shoket (2007–2014)
 Michelle Tan (2014–2016)
 Michele Promaulayko (2016–October 2018)
 Kristin Koch (October 2018–present)

Changes in United States cover price

Logos
From September of 1944, there are four different logos for this magazine. The first and current logo was in use from September 1944 to June 1977, and has been in the use again from January 2004, the second logo was in use from June 1977 to August 1992, the third logo was in use from August 1992 to February 2002, and the fourth logo was in use from February 2002 to January 2004.

See also
16 (magazine)
List of teen magazines

References

External links
 Official site
 Official Indonesian site
 Edwin Miller Interviews for Seventeen Magazine Manuscripts and Archives Division, The New York Public Library.

Former News Corporation subsidiaries
Hearst Communications publications
Magazines established in 1944
Magazines published in New York City
Magazines published in the United States
Monthly magazines published in the United States
Teen magazines
Women's fashion magazines